Autoroute 930 (A-930) is an autoroute located Candiac, Montérégie, Quebec, and is a freeway spur of Autoroute 30. Originally opened in 1996, it was part of Autoroute 30 until November 6, 2011, when A-30 was realigned and extended west.

Exit list
From west to east; old exit numbers are former A-30 exit numbers.

References

External links
 Transports Quebec Map 

930